Mirawas (born; 1955 ) (Urdu: میراوس) is Pakistani pashto stand up comedian and singer

Career
Mirwas became an instant joke cracker in ninth grade and children enjoy his show every week from nearby schools. He has appeared in numerous shows, radio and TV programs, but apart from that, more than 500 cassettes and 800 comedy Pashto albums are also available in the market. He has also performed abroad on stage in 20 countries. For the first time in the 80's, he campaigned on PTV against drug addicts.

Literacy work

 Gap da Mirawas - Haqiqat pa Toqo Toqo ke (Pashto)

See also
Syed Rahman Shino
Ismail Shahid

References

Living people
1955 births
Pakistani male comedians
People from Charsadda District, Pakistan
Pakistani stand-up comedians
Pashtun people